Established in 1832 by the Dildarzai sub-clan of Mazari Family, the beautiful and tiny town of Dera Dildaar was previously known as Thalion.The people of this Family play important role in Politics. The people of this area dera dildar are chief of the said area. These people also solve the problems of their people who approach them for any kind of help. These people also make decisions among the people. The Dildarzi people are famous in their region and Tehsil.The town is named after Sardar Dildar Khan Mazari.This town is located 180 km from Bahawalpur, Pakistan, with a latitude of 28.7097, longitude of 70.0056 and an altitude of 72m. It is also 513 km from Karachi and from 523 km from Lahore. The GMT time in Dera Dildar is +5 hours.

Facilities
Dera Dildaar has electricity, a basic Health Unit and a small Bazaar.

References

Populated places in Rajanpur District